Peter Jansen is a former New Zealand rower.

At the 1979 World Rowing Championships at Bled in Slovenia, Yugoslavia, he won a silver medal with the New Zealand eight in seat six. Jansen is a rowing coach at King's College in Auckland.

References

Year of birth missing (living people)
Living people
New Zealand male rowers
World Rowing Championships medalists for New Zealand